Jesse Bravo is an American psychic known for being an investment banker, media personality and psychic medium. He appeared in the Impractical Jokers episode "Medium, Well Done", where he performed a psychic evaluation on Sal Vulcano.

References

External links
 MTV News "Lady Gaga’s Big 2012: A Psychic Weighs In" (Jan 06 2012)

1973 births
Living people
American investment bankers
American media personalities
American psychics